KLIF is a commercial AM radio radio station licensed to Dallas, Texas.  The station is owned by Cumulus Media and broadcasts a talk radio format to the Dallas-Fort Worth Metroplex.  The studios are in the Victory Park district in Dallas, just north of downtown.

Its transmitter is shared with co-owned  KTCK, on Ledbetter Road in Irving. It uses a directional antenna at all times, with a two-tower array. Programming is also heard on the HD Radio digital subchannel of co-owned 96.3 KSCS-HD2.

KLIF is one of the two talk stations owned by Cumulus in the Dallas Metroplex. Sister station  WBAP has mostly local hosts while much of KLIF's schedule is made up of nationally syndicated talk shows.  KLIF's sole local weekday program is a morning news and information show co-hosted by Dave Williams and Amy Chodroff. The rest of the day, KLIF carries Glenn Beck, "Markley, Van Camp, & Robbins," Ben Shapiro, Sean Hannity, Michael J. Knowles, Jim Bohannon and "Coast to Coast AM with George Noory". Weekends include shows on money, health, gardening, home repair and cars, as well as brokered programming.  Syndicated weekend hosts include Dana Loesch and Bill Cunningham. Most hours begin with Fox News Radio.

Station history

Early years
It was in Wichita Falls, Texas, and the call sign was KGKO. The station then moved to Fort Worth after being purchased by Amon Carter, getting the new call sign WFAA. (In the early days of radio, many stations in Texas were given call letters beginning with a "W.") WFAA and WBAP had a shared time agreement that lasted until May 1, 1970, when WFAA operated on 570 alone and WBAP became the sole operator on 820. This arrangement allowed both stations to program full-time music formats. WBAP launched a successful country music format (which eventually changed to the news/talk format the station now programs), while WFAA moved to an adult-oriented Top 40 format to compete with KLIF and KNUS-FM.

WFAA's music format lasted until the mid-1970s, when the station began a talk radio format that lasted until July 2, 1983. At that point, the station began broadcasting in AM stereo with classic rock music and the call letters KRQX. The station flipped on January 26, 1987, to a 1950s and 1960s oldies format, with new call letters KLDD. In January 1990, the station switched to a simulcast of KKWM-FM as KKWM.

On February 5, 1990, Susquehanna Radio Corporation purchased KKWM from Anchor Media Ltd. That purchase became final on November 29, 1990. Beginning at 5:00 that morning, KLIF simulcast on both the 570 and 1190 frequencies for one week, and then began broadcasting on 570 kHz permanently. Susquehanna Radio Corporation, a division of kitchenware maker Susquehanna Pfaltzgraff, was sold to Cumulus Broadcasting in 2005.

Despite different owners, KLIF and KDFW maintain a partnership. KLIF is affiliated with Fox News Radio, while KDFW is the local Fox O&O (owned and operated) station. In January 2015, KLIF began carrying Westwood One News from its parent company's news operation. On August 30, 2020, KLIF once again became an affiliate of Fox News Radio after Westwood One News ended operations. KDFW-TV provides some local news and weather coverage.

KLIF is licensed to transmit a digital signal using iBiquity's "HD Radio" system but stopped in 2009. Because the license to broadcast digital "HD Radio" is perpetual, the station could resume digital broadcasts at any time. Meanwhile, this station's signal had been retransmitted on sister station KLIF-FM-HD2. KLIF-FM temporarily stopped its digital (HD Radio) simulcast in late November 2011 and resumed in early January 2012. As of February 2013, the simulcast has been moved to KSCS-HD2.

For many years, KLIF ran 5,000 watts of power around the clock from a transmitter site in Coppell near North Lake. In July 2016, KLIF filed an application for an FCC construction permit to diplex from the KTCK transmitter site, on Ledbetter Road in Irving, and decrease night power to 2,400 watts. The switch to the Irving site was made several years later. While Cumulus has profited from sales of other transmitter sites such as WMAL (AM) and KABC (AM), the North Lake land is owned by an electric utility and was rented by the 570 station.

First news/talk era

An event which foreshadowed KLIF's future success in the news/talk format was the assassination of John F. Kennedy on November 22, 1963. Even though it was a Top 40 station, KLIF News was always quick to report news bulletins when they came in. The station was one of the first media outlets on the air with reports of the shooting.

KLIF 1190 AM changed to talk radio during the early 1980s and became one of the market's leading talk radio stations before other competitors soon emerged. KRLD, its primary competitor during the mid and late 1980s, was mostly all news but with talk shows nights and weekends.

KLIF had a "classic" lineup of hosts. Kevin McCarthy, with a more centrist point of view, held the midday spot with interviews and conversational radio. David Gold had the late afternoon shift with his brand of conservatism. The station's morning show featured Norm Hitzges on sports. Up until then, sports talk had primarily aired in afternoons and evenings in most U.S. cities. That lineup made the station one of the most respected Dallas-Fort Worth talk radio stations. Community leaders and politicians listened regularly, according to a Dallas magazine report.

It was during this time when KLIF achieved its highest ratings ever as a news-talk station, the only time it ever cracked the Top 10 after its Top 40 heyday.

During the 1995 OJ Simpson trials, KLIF simulcasted the audio of KDFI’s trial wrap ups.

Competition in the form of all-sports radio began to hurt KLIF's ratings. Other stations offered more opinionated talk show hosts. As a result, the station's ratings plummeted, barely garnering a 1.0 share.

Flip to all-news blocks, return to mostly talk
Cumulus Media acquired Citadel Broadcasting in late 2011, bringing KLIF and its larger rival WBAP-AM-FM under common ownership. To reflect the common ownership between the two channels, KLIF began swapping programming with WBAP and retooled its AM/PM drive to an all-news radio format, designed to compete against CBS Radio-owned KRLD.

KLIF replaced Fox News Radio's top-of-the-hour newscast with ABC News Radio's and later switched to the parent company's Westwood One News service. Afternoon host Chris Krok was transferred to WBAP for a local talk show in the evening hours, while morning host Jeff Bolton was dismissed. Two talk shows, The Mike Huckabee Show and The Dave Ramsey Show, remained on KLIF's lineup. (Ramsey eventually moved over to KRLD.) KLIF at first discontinued Coast to Coast AM, with the show eventually moving to competitor KFXR. , it has returned to KLIF.

Call sign history
The call letters KLIF achieved recognition in radio broadcasting through the efforts of noted radio programmer and owner Gordon McLendon. KLIF, which was formerly on 1190 AM, had been Dallas' biggest Top 40 radio stations, and widely respected across the U.S. Playing Top 40 music during the 1950s and 1960s, it achieved an over 50 share, an unparalleled ratings success.

The station saw success in music and talk radio broadcasting. In 1954, 1190 KLIF switched from a more varied music programming approach to one that focused on hit music with periodic news updates. McLendon collected the names of local leaders in business and government working them into news on the station. McLendon said there were only two things that radio could compete with television on: "music and news". The operations were headquartered at KLIF Triangle Point Studios from 1964 to 1980. It is a street front building with large windows where pedestrians and Downtown Dallas shoppers could look in the studio and see the action of live broadcasts.

KLIF was known for its promotions which included top 40 surveys with photo shoots of the broadcasters. The disc jockeys were frequently at live promotion events. KLIF did live shows in different parts of the Metroplex. The announcers often toured the city in the KLIF radio vehicles. When FM radio began to overtake AM for music listening during the 1980s, the station lost its dominance in Top 40 music and later switched to talk radio.

Former hosts
Hosts previously heard on KLIF included Darrell Ankarlo, Jeff Bolton, Yolanda Gaskins, David Gold, Norm Hitzges, Tom Kamb, Greg Knapp, Kevin McCarthy, Freddy Mertz, Michael O'Shea, Bob Ray Sanders, Kevin Stovall, Jon-David Wells, Grant Stinchfield and Mike Selden.

References

External links
KLIF official website

Dallas Observer article on KLIF's troubles. Goes into when the station had the city's talk radio ears.
 DFW Radio Archives
 DFW Radio/TV History

LIF
News and talk radio stations in the United States
Cumulus Media radio stations
Radio stations established in 1922
Radio stations licensed before 1923 and still broadcasting